Ángeles de la Ciudad is a Mexican football club that plays in the Tercera División de México. The club is based in Coyoacán, Mexico City.

History
The team was founded in 2012 as a social project of the Government of Mexico City with the objective of combating social exclusion and the risk of drug use among youth from socially disadvantaged sectors.

See also
Futbol in Mexico
Mexico City
Tercera División de México

References

External links
Facebook Page

Football clubs in Mexico City
2012 establishments in Mexico